Kostas Frantzeskos (born 4 January 1969) is a Greek professional football manager and former player.

Frantzeskos is better known for his deadly free-kick accuracy. He scored 57 free kick goals during his career.

Career
As a youngster, Kostas played for Vouliagmeni. He started his Football A Division career in Panathinaikos, after they picked him up in 1990. He was very quick to adapt and soon made his 1st division debut, in a very successful season, with Panathinaikos winning the double. He made nearly 100 appearances for the Greens - including 11 European games - winning one championship and three cups.

In 1994, he was transferred to OFI and spent two seasons there, under coach Eugène Gerards, which he still holds to the highest esteem. He appeared in many games, becoming a mainstay in the Cretan team's midfield.

At the second half of 1996/97 season, Frantzeskos left OFI for PAOK. He was one of the many Greek star-players bought at that time by then-PAOK owner Giorgos Batatoudis, along with Zisis Vryzas, Vassilis Borbokis, Spiros Marangos, and others. He was much loved by PAOK fans for his many memorable goals, especially his winner against Arsenal in the first round first leg of the 1997/98 UEFA Cup, in Toumba Stadium. PAOK went on to win the tie 2–1 on aggregate. He made over 100 appearances with PAOK during his 3-year stay, scoring 45 goals. He also made 12 appearances in the UEFA Cup, scoring 6 times.
His standout performances helped him develop a good reputation in Europe especially after having some very good European match performances with PAOK.

After turning 31, Kostas left PAOK in 2000 for Kalamata, a much smaller club, then struggling for survival in the 1st Division. His tenure there was rather short, and although making a handful of appearances, he could not help the club stay in the first division. He left the next year for Ionikos, another mid-range club, also battling to avoid relegation. Managing even less appearances than the previous year, Frantzeskos decided to try out the Cypriot League, signing for AEK Larnaca, where he regained some of his former glory. That was not the case, however, when he returned to Greece in 2003, playing half a season for Aris Thessaloniki F.C. and another half for Proodeftiki. In 2003–2004 Aris narrowly escaped relegation, yet Proodeftiki was not equally lucky - so Frantzeskos finished his 15-year-long career in relative obscurity, playing a season in the Second Division until 2005.

Style of play
Frantzeskos holds the record in Greece for the most goals ever scored from direct free-kicks, always using his left foot. He was frequently cited as one of the most accurate free-kick takers in Europe, especially while playing for PAOK. He even scored a few of them in the UEFA Cup, most notably the two against Atlético Madrid, much to keeper José Francisco Molina's anguish, both home and away. He continued scoring from spot-kicks on to his last days, scoring a few for Proodeftiki.
He also holds a rather unusual record of being the only player in Greece to score a hat trick with free-kicks and one of only four in the world (the others are Giuseppe Signori, Siniša Mihajlović and Ray McKinnon), in the last game of the 1996–1997 season, with PAOK playing against Kastoria FC.
Quite surprisingly, Frantzeskos was very inefficient at scoring from the penalty spot - which led to his famous quote during an interview: "Next time we win a penalty, and they want me to take it, I'll ask for a wall".

National team
Frantzeskos debuted for the national team in 1992, in a friendly match against Cyprus, held in Kaftanzoglio Stadium, with Cyprus winning 2–3. He was an important member of the squad that qualified to the 1994 World Cup. He ended his national years in 2000, again in a friendly match, this time against Austria, held in Kalamata.
He has been capped a total of 38 times for Greece, scoring 7 goals.

Managerial statistics 
As of 27 September 2022

Honours
Panathinaikos:
Greek Championship (1):  1991
Greek Cup (3): 1991, 1993, 1994

Individual
PAOK MVP of the Season: 1997–1998, 1998–1999, 1999–2000

References

1969 births
Living people
Greece international footballers
OFI Crete F.C. players
Panathinaikos F.C. players
PAOK FC players
Aris Thessaloniki F.C. players
Kalamata F.C. players
Ionikos F.C. players
Proodeftiki F.C. players
AEK Larnaca FC players
Expatriate footballers in Cyprus
Super League Greece players
Cypriot First Division players
Panathinaikos F.C. non-playing staff
Association football midfielders
Footballers from Athens
Greek footballers